The 2010–11 Al-Hilal FC season was Al-Hilal Saudi Football Club's 54th in existence and 35th consecutive season in the top flight of Saudi Arabian football. Along with Pro League, the club participated in the AFC Champions League, Crown Prince Cup, and the King Cup.

Players

Squad information
Players and squad numbers.Note: Flags indicate national team as has been defined under FIFA eligibility rules. Players may hold more than one non-FIFA nationality.

Competitions

Overall

Overview

Pro League

League table

Results summary

Results by round

Matches

Crown Prince Cup

King Cup of Champions

Quarter-finals

Semi-finals

Third place

2010 AFC Champions League

Knockout stage

Quarter-finals

Semi-finals

2011 AFC Champions League

Group stage

Knockout stage

Round of 16

Statistics

Goalscorers

Assists

See also
List of unbeaten football club seasons

References

Al Hilal SFC seasons
Hilal